Macmahon Holdings Limited was founded by Brian Macmahon, an Adelaide civil engineer, in 1963. It is based in Perth, Western Australia, with offices in Queensland, South Australia, Indonesia and Malaysia.

The company operates in the Mining and Construction sectors and is listed on the Australian Stock Exchange.  It has an annual turnover of about A$850 million.

In June 2008, Macmahon made a hostile takeover bid for rival company Ausdrill Ltd.

In January 2013, MacMahon secured its largest ever contract from Fortescue Metals Group after it was awarded a $1.8 billion contract for the Christmas Creek mining operation's expansion. The five-year contract would deliver all aspects of mine operations, including drill and blast, overburden removal, ore harvesting, maintenance of equipment and associated services, for the expansion.

Macmahon Holdings also operates in the construction industry under the name Macmahon Contractors. It is unrelated to an Adelaide-based company named McMahon Services.

References

External links
 www.macmahon.com.au

Mining services companies of Australia
Holding companies of Australia
Companies based in Perth, Western Australia
Holding companies established in 1963
Non-renewable resource companies established in 1963
Australian companies established in 1963